Hilde Nakling (born 4. May 1982) is a Norwegian shooter who during the 2014 IPSC World Shoot claimed the title as World Champion in the Lady Standard Division. She is the daughter of Vidar Nakling, 1980 IPSC European Champion and an active shooter until 1996. Hilde visited the shooting range for the first time already three months old, and gradually got to try various small firearms. During the early years she only attended the range once or twice a year, and it was not until she took a beginners course in 2005 that she became seriously hooked. Since 2006 she has competed actively. To prepare for the 2014 World Shoot she quit her day job as a nurse at the Oslo University Hospital, and continued to work shifts as a nurse on the pediatric ward.

Merits 
 1st place 2014 IPSC Handgun World Shoot, Lady Standard 
 3rd place 2010 IPSC European Handgun Championship, Lady Standard
 5th place 2011 IPSC Handgun World Shoot, Lady Standard
 5th place 2008 IPSC Handgun World Shoot, Lady Standard
 15th place overall 2014 IPSC Nordic Handgun Championship, Standard

References

IPSC shooters
IPSC World Shoot Champions
Norwegian nurses
Norwegian female sport shooters
1982 births
Living people
21st-century Norwegian women